Sebastian Wurth (born 21 July 1994 in Wipperfürth, North Rhine-Westphalia) is a German singer and was a participant in season 8 of Deutschland sucht den Superstar, making it to the Top 5.

Biography

Early life
Sebastian was born in Wipperfürth, North Rhine-Westphalia on 21 July 1994. He is a fan of Bayern Munich. He has already tried to be a songwriter. In his free time, he plays soccer, goes bowling, and likes to go to the cinema. He has a scooter. If his music career does not work out, he would like to study medicine or acting.

Deutschland sucht den Superstar

He was the youngest participant in season 8. Dieter Bohlen sees great potential in him. He is often compared with Justin Bieber because of their similar hair styles. RTL received a statement from the Office of Public Safety stating that Sebastian Wurth was not allowed to participate after 10 PM. RTL also received a 15,000 Euro fine for allowing him to participate after 10 PM.

Performances

Post-DSDS

Sebastian Wurth released his first single called "Hard to Love You". Sebastian is working with Tom Hugo and Erik Nyholm. Wurth has started a joint project with fellow DSDS alumni Dominik Büchele. Wurth stated that he miss the hype from DSDS. He does occasional appearances.

Discography

Albums

Singles

References

1994 births
People from Wipperfürth
People from Oberbergischer Kreis
Deutschland sucht den Superstar participants
Living people
21st-century German male singers